Hatipathar is a beautiful spot for picnic  and one of the identified Tourist Centres(scenic spot). of odisha located in Rayagada district of the Indian state of Odisha. The scenic spot with two water falls on the river Nagavali, is situated at a distance of 3 km from the town Rayagada. The two huge boulders on the hill top appear like massive elephants. The name Hatipathar( elephant stone) derives from the scene which looks like huge elephants. The 2006 heavy rains changed the course of the river Nagavali and damaged the proposed 10 MW Small H.E. Project 
for which visitors are not welcome to visit this place currently. However the revival project of Hatipathar waterfall is being taken up to give it a new look. The nearby places of attraction are as follows.

References

External links
  "Official website of Rayagada district"

Rayagada district